About Time is an album by the blues rock band Ten Years After, released in 1989. It was the final studio album featuring Alvin Lee, their singer and most prominent songwriter since the band's formation. It was their first studio release in fifteen years (since Positive Vibrations, in 1974).

About Time peaked at number 120 on the US Billboard 200.

Production
Recorded at Ardent Studios in Memphis, the album was produced by Terry Manning.

Critical reception

The Boston Globe noted that "pile-driving party rock is the order of the day, with guitarist Alvin Lee's fuzzed solos stealing the show as usual." The Windsor Star wrote that "the ham-handed rock-blues songs sound like outtakes from TYA's best years."

Track listing 

Notes
 The track order is different for the CD release, which puts "Wild is the River" between "Working in a Parking Lot" and "Outside My Window".

Personnel
Ten Years After
Alvin Lee – guitar, vocals
Leo Lyons – bass
Ric Lee – drums
Chick Churchill – keyboards
with:
Nick Carls – backing vocals
Jimi Jamison – backing vocals
Technical
Terry Manning – engineer, producer

References

Ten Years After albums
1989 albums
Chrysalis Records albums